Bredsten is a village in Vejle Municipality, Denmark. Bredsten is situated 11 kilometres west of Vejle, and it has a population of 1,711 (1 January 2022). The village is quite old, indicated by the church which dates back to the Middle Ages though modified by the local entrepreneur de Lichtenberg in the 1740s. 

Bredsten is known for a few famous persons, among them businessman Harry Motor, the former editor of BT, Arne Ullum, the Grand Champion of the quiz show Jeopardy, Jens Madsen, Lars Døhr, former soccer player in Vejle Boldklub and the former soccer legend John Sivebæk.

References

Cities and towns in the Region of Southern Denmark
Vejle Municipality